Ghesquierellana thaumasia is a moth in the family Crambidae. It was described by Eugene G. Munroe in 1959. It is found in Cameroon.

References

Moths described in 1959
Spilomelinae